Kirayi Dada is a 1987 Indian Telugu-language action drama film produced by V. Doraswamy Raju under VMC Productions and directed by A. Kodandarami Reddy. It stars Nagarjuna, Amala, Khusboo, Krishnam Raju, Jaya Sudha  and music composed by Chakravarthy. This film is a remake of the Hindi movie Jaal (1986). This was Amala's Telugu debut and after this film, she'd played some other leading roles with her future husband, Nagarjuna and the duo's pair was considered the finest amongst the Tollywood.

Plot
Vijay is an unemployed guy suffering from family problems. Rani Malini, alias Arunabai, a Kothi dancer appoints him as a spy against Naga Raja Varma, a Zamindar of an estate. Vijay goes to his estate and gets a job, Naga Raja Varma's daughter Rekha and Naga Raja Varma's henchman Koti's daughter Latha love Vijay, but Vijay loves Latha. One day, Vijay discovers that Naga Raja Varma's younger brother Krishna Raja Varma is Malini's husband who was killed by Naga Raja Varma; and Vijay's father Satyam is trapped in the case and Latha is Malini's daughter. The rest of the story is about how Vijay defeats Naga Raja Varma in the climax.

Cast

 Nagarjuna as Vijay
 Amala Akkineni as Latha
 Khusboo as Rekha
 Krishnam Raju as Zamindar Chinababu Krishna Raja Varma
 Jaya Sudha as Rani Malini / Arunabai
 Rao Gopal Rao as Nagaraja Varma
 Gollapudi Maruti Rao as Damodaram
 Murali Mohan as Satyam
 Sudhakar as Jackie
 Sreedhar Surapaneni as Koti
 Rallapalli as Sivayya
 Mada Venkateswara Rao as Chitti
 Suthi Veerabhadra Rao as Gadala Gavaraju 
 KK Sarma as Ratio shop owner
 Annapoorna as Parvatamma
 Varalakshmi as Lakshmi
 Anita as Janaki
 Maheeja as Chilaka

Soundtrack

Music was composed by Chakravarthy. Lyrics were written by Veturi. Music released on SAPTASWAR Audio Company.

References

External links

1987 films
Films scored by K. Chakravarthy
Films directed by A. Kodandarami Reddy
Telugu remakes of Hindi films
1980s Telugu-language films